Tarialan (field) is a sum (district) of Uvs Province in western Mongolia.

It is the closest sum to Ulaangom, only about 30 km away from the provincial capital. The center of the sum is on Kharkhiraa river coming out of the Kharkhiraa mountain.

It is home to the Khoton speakers of the Oirat language. The Khoton practice a syncretic religion incorporating elements from Islam, and Tengri shamanism.

Populated places in Mongolia
Districts of Uvs Province